Dominik Kubalík (born 21 August 1995) is a Czech professional ice hockey forward for the Detroit Red Wings of the National Hockey League (NHL). He was selected in the seventh round (191st overall) by the Los Angeles Kings during the 2013 NHL Entry Draft.

Playing career

Professional
Kubalík made his Czech Extraliga debut playing with HC Plzeň during the 2011–12 Czech Extraliga season. He recorded 17 points in 24 games.

Kubalík spent the 2012–13 season with the Sudbury Wolves of the Ontario Hockey League (OHL). After scoring 34 points in 67 games, he was selected in the seventh round (191st overall) by the Los Angeles Kings in the 2013 NHL Entry Draft.

Kubalík returned to the Wolves for the 2013–14 season. On 10 January 2014, Kubalík (along with two second-round draft picks) was traded to the Kitchener Rangers in exchange for Radek Faksa.

On 8 April 2014, Kubalík returned to HC Plzeň.

On 25 August 2017, Kubalík signed a three-year contract with HC Ambrì-Piotta of the National League (NL). He split the 2017–18 season between HC Ambrì-Piotta and HC Plzeň (while on loan).

On 24 January 2019, Kubalík's NHL rights were traded to the Chicago Blackhawks in exchange for a 2019 fifth-round pick. He finished the 2018–19 season with 57 points in 50 games, and was named the Switzerland Hockey National League's most valuable player.

On 29 May 2019, the Blackhawks signed Kubalík to a one-year, $925,000 contract.

On 10 October 2019, Kubalík scored his first career NHL goal in a 5–4 loss to the San Jose Sharks. On 27 February 2020, Kubalík recorded his first career NHL hat-trick in a 5–2 victory over the Tampa Bay Lightning. All 3 of Kubalík's goals came in the third period. He finished the regular season with 30 goals and 16 assists for 46 points in 68 games. On 15 July 2020, Kubalík was named a finalist for the Calder Memorial Trophy (alongside Quinn Hughes and Cale Makar), which is awarded to the league's best first-year player.

The Blackhawks met the Edmonton Oilers in the 2020 Qualifying Round. In Game 1 of the series, Kubalík recorded 2 goals and 3 assists in a 6–4 win. His 5 points were the most scored in an NHL postseason debut in league history.

As an impending restricted free agent following the conclusion of his contract on completion of the  season, Kubalík was not tendered a qualifying offer by the rebuilding Blackhawks, and was released to free agency on 12 July 2022. On the opening day of free agency on 13 July, Kubalík signed a two-year, $5 million contract with the Detroit Red Wings.

Personal life
Kubalík's older brother, Tomáš, was a fifth-round draft pick by the Columbus Blue Jackets in the 2008 NHL Entry Draft, and played 12 games for the organization. He currently plays for HC Vítkovice Ridera in the Czech Extraliga.

Career statistics

Regular season and playoffs

International

Awards and honors

References

External links
 

1995 births
Living people
HC Ambrì-Piotta players
BK Havlíčkův Brod players
Chicago Blackhawks players
Czech expatriate ice hockey players in Canada
Czech expatriate ice hockey players in Switzerland
Czech expatriate ice hockey players in the United States
Czech ice hockey left wingers
Detroit Red Wings players
Kitchener Rangers players
Los Angeles Kings draft picks
Ice hockey players at the 2018 Winter Olympics
Olympic ice hockey players of the Czech Republic
Sportspeople from Plzeň
HC Plzeň players
Sudbury Wolves players